Wadih is an Arabic name and may refer to:

 Wadih al-Siqlabi (died 1011), Slavic Muslim general in Spain
 Wadih el-Hage (born 1960), Lebanese al-Qaeda member serving a life sentence in the United States
 Wadih El Safi (1921–2013), Lebanese singer, songwriter, composer and actor
 Wadih Sabra (1876–1952), Lebanese composer  

Arabic masculine given names